These are the singles that reached number one on the Top 100 Singles chart in 1990 as published by Cash Box magazine.

See also
1990 in music
List of Hot 100 number-one singles of 1990 (U.S.)

References
https://web.archive.org/web/20110818051806/http://cashboxmagazine.com/archives/90s_files/1990.html

1990
1990 record charts
1990 in American music